This article contains a list of the dragonfly species recorded in Estonia. The total number of species recorded is 51 (made up of 17 damselflies (suborder Zygoptera) and 34 true dragonflies) (suborder Anisoptera)

Suborder Zygoptera (damselflies)

Family Calopterygidae (demoiselles)
Banded demoiselle, Calopteryx splendens
Beautiful demoiselle, Calopteryx virgo

Family Lestidae (emerald damselflies)
Lestes virens
Scarce Emerald Damselfly, Lestes dryas (=Lestes nympha)
Emerald Damselfly, Lestes sponsa

Family Coenagrionidae (blue, blue-tailed, and red damselflies)
White-legged Damselfly, Platycnemis pennipes
Pygmy Damselfly, Nehalennia speciosa
Blue-tailed Damselfly, Ischnura elegans
Common Blue Damselfly, Enallagma cyathigerum
Arctic Bluet, Coenagrion johanssoni
Northern Damselfly, Coenagrion hastulatum
Norfolk Damselfly, Coenagrion armatum
Irish Damselfly, Coenagrion lunulatum
Variable Damselfly, Coenagrion pulchellum
Azure Damselfly, Coenagrion puella
Red-eyed Damselfly, Erythromma najas
Large Red Damselfly, Pyrrhosoma nymphula

Suborder Anisoptera (true dragonflies)

Family Gomphidae (club-tailed dragonflies)
Yellow-legged Dragonfly, Gomphus flavipes
Club-tailed Dragonfly, Gomphus vulgatissimis
Green club-tailed dragonfly, Ophiogomphus cecilia
Green-eyed hook-tailed dragonfly, Onychogomphus forcipatus

Family Aeshnidae (hawkers and emperors)
Hairy Dragonfly, Brachytron pratense
Azure Hawker, Aeshna caerulea (=Aeshna squamata)
Common Hawker, Aeshna juncea
Migrant hawker, Aeshna coluberculus
Southern Hawker, Aescna cyanea
Green hawker, Aeshna viridis
Brown hawker, Aeshna grandis
Subarctic darner, Aeshna subarctica
Aeshna osiliensis

Family Cordulegastridae (golden-ringed Dragonflies)
Golden-ringed dragonfly, Cordulegaster annulatus

Family Corduliidae (emerald dragonflies)
Two-spotted Dragonfly, Epitheca bimaculata
Downy Emerald, Cordulia aenea
Brilliant Emerald, Somatochlora metallica
Yellow-spotted emerald, Somatochlora flavomaculata
Northern Emerald, Somatochlora arctica

Family Libellulidae (chasers, skimmers, and darters)
Keeled Skimmer, Orthetrum coerulescens
Black-tailed Skimmer, Orthetrum cancellatum
Broad-bodied Chaser, Libellula depressa
Four-spotted Chaser, Libellula quadrimaculata
Scarce Chaser, Libellula fulva
Yellow-winged Darter, Sympetrum flaveolum
Black Darter, Sympetrum danae
Vagrant Darter, Sympetrum vulgatum
Common Darter, Sympetrum striolatum
Ruddy Darter, Sympetrum sanguineum
Leucorrhinia caudalis
Eastern White-faced Darter, Leucorrhinia albifrons
Large White-faced Darter, Leucorrhinia pectoralis
White-faced Darter, Leucorrhinia dubia
Northern White-faced Darter, Leucorrhinia rubicunda

References 

Estonia
Dragonflies
Dragonflies of Europe
Insects of Europe